The 2017–18 WNBL season was the 38th season of the competition since its establishment in 1981. The regular season began on 5 October 2017, with the Melbourne Boomers visiting the Dandenong Rangers. The Sydney Uni Flames were the defending champions but were defeated in the semi-finals by Townsville. The Townsville Fire took home their third WNBL championship after defeating Melbourne, 2–0.

This season sees the return to television, with Fox Sports broadcasting the WNBL for the first time since 2015. Spalding once again provided equipment including the official game ball, whilst iAthletic took over supplying team apparel.

Player movement

Standings

Finals

Statistics

Individual statistic leaders

Individual game highs

Awards

Player of the Week

Team of the Week

Postseason Awards

Team captains and coaches

References

External links 
 WNBL official website

 
2017–18 in Australian basketball
Australia
Basketball
Basketball